= Chrystal Lermusiaux =

Belgian footballer (born 2001)

Personal information
- Date of birth: 7 June 2001 (age 25)
- Position: Defender

Team information
- Current team: Lille

Chrystal Lermusiaux (born 7 June 2001) is a Belgian footballer who plays for Lille.
